The Rainy River is a river, approximately  long, forming part of the Canada–United States border separating Northwestern Ontario and northern Minnesota.

History

The river issues from the west side of Rainy Lake (French: lac à la Pluie; Ojibwe: Gojiji-zaaga'igan) and flows generally west-northwest, between International Falls, Minnesota, and Fort Frances, Ontario, and between Baudette, Minnesota, and Rainy River, Ontario. The Couchiching First Nation (the Ojibwe name spelled in transliterated form) is associated with this river, where it had traditional territory. 

The name of Koochiching County, Minnesota was derived from the Ojibwe term. Rainy Lake and the river were named by French colonists. These names were translated and adopted into English by British colonists. The town of Rainy River, Ontario was not developed until the late 19th century and not named until the early 20th century.  

A dam at International Falls generates hydroelectricity from the river. It was the southeast corner of the huge tract of land granted in 1670 by the English Crown to the Hudson's Bay Company. The river ultimately drains through the Winnipeg River, Lake Winnipeg, and the Nelson River into Hudson Bay.

The Baudette-Rainy River International Bridge and the Fort Frances-International Falls International Bridge both cross the Rainy River.

The Ontario and Rainy River Railway, opened in 1901 and now part of Canadian National, follows the river on the Canadian side.

Notoriety
A white sucker weighing 6lb 8oz caught on the Rainy River near Loman, Minnesota stands as the IGFA all tackle world record.

American author Tim O'Brien's novel The Things They Carried (1990), set during the Vietnam War, includes a chapter, "On the Rainy River," referring to this territory.

See also
Pigeon River
Winnipeg River, for exploration and fur trade
List of rivers of Minnesota
List of longest streams of Minnesota
List of international border rivers
List of Ontario rivers
Rainy Lake
Lake sturgeon

References

External links

State of Minnesota: Rainy River Basin

Rivers of Minnesota
Rivers of Rainy River District
Canada–United States border
International rivers of North America
Rivers of Koochiching County, Minnesota
Rivers of Lake of the Woods County, Minnesota
Border rivers
Tributaries of Hudson Bay